Law & Society Review is a peer-reviewed academic journal in the field of law and society, which is part of the larger field known as the sociology of law. It was established by the Law and Society Association in 1966 and is published by Wiley-Blackwell. It has four issues per volume per year.

Abstracting and indexing 
Law & Society Review is abstracted and indexed in the Social Sciences Citation Index. According to the Journal Citation Reports, the journal has a 2013 impact factor of 1.310, ranking it 31st out of 138 journals in the category "Sociology".

References

External links
 

English-language journals
Law journals
Publications established in 1966
Quarterly journals
Sociology journals
Wiley-Blackwell academic journals